Aedes annulirostris is a species complex of zoophilic mosquito belonging to the genus Aedes. It is found in Sri Lanka, India, and Nepal.

References

annulirostris